Jarkko Määttä (born 28 December 1994) is a Finnish ski jumper.

Määttä competed at the 2014 Winter Olympics for Finland. He placed 36th in the normal hill qualifying round and 32nd in the first jump of the final round, but did not advance. He then placed 33rd in the large hill qualifying round and 43rd on the first jump of the final, also failing to advance. He was also a member of the Finnish team that placed eighth in the team event.

Määttä made his World Cup debut in November 2010. His current best World Cup finish is fourth, in a team event at Klingenthal on 22 November 2014; his best individual World Cup finish is ninth, in a large hill event at Lahti in the same season. His best overall World Cup finish is 32nd, in 2014–15.

References

External links 
 

1994 births
Living people
Olympic ski jumpers of Finland
Ski jumpers at the 2014 Winter Olympics
Ski jumpers at the 2018 Winter Olympics
People from Iisalmi
Finnish male ski jumpers
Sportspeople from North Savo
21st-century Finnish people